Catherine Engelbert (born November 14, 1964) is an American business executive and Commissioner of the Women's National Basketball Association (WNBA). Before joining the WNBA, she had been with Deloitte for 33 years, including as its first female CEO from 2015 to 2019.

Early life and education
Engelbert was born circa 1964 and grew up in Collingswood, New Jersey, with five brothers and two sisters, and attended Collingswood High School. She was inducted into the Collingswood Athletic Hall of Fame in 1993. Her father was an IT manager, and her mother a medical practice administrator. She graduated from Lehigh University in 1986, with a degree in accounting. At Lehigh, she tried out for the basketball team as a walk-on under Hall of Fame coach Muffet McGraw, and later became a team captain.  She also played lacrosse, and became a captain of that team as well. After graduation, she received her CPA certification and became a member of the American Institute of Certified Public Accountants.

Career
Catherine Engelbert joined Deloitte in 1986, and worked with the company until retiring in 2019. Joining the WNBA later in 2019. In an interview, she credited the firm's early focus on supporting women in the workplace as being important for her career.

Prior to being appointed the CEO of Deloitte in March 2015, she was the chairman and CEO of the audit subsidiary, Deloitte & Touche LLP.

Other senior positions Engelbert held at Deloitte include: national managing partner - regions for Deloitte & Touche; deputy national professional practice director; and financial accounting and reporting services quality risk manager. She was named a partner in 1998.

On May 15, 2019, she was named the first Commissioner of the WNBA (previous WNBA leaders had been titled "President"). Engelbert officially assumed her new role on July 17, 2019.

On becoming CEO for Deloitte, this rendered Engelbert the first female U.S. CEO of a Big Four firm. News media outlets, including The Wall Street Journal highlighted Engelbert's appointment as cracking the "glass ceiling." While serving as Deloitte's CEO, the company's revenue has increased nearly 6% year over year to $18.6 billion.

Engelbert also serves on the Boards of McDonald’s Corporation, Royalty Pharma and Catalyst, and on the Executive Committee of the USGA.

Personal life 

Engelbert has two children, Julia and Thomas, and lives in Berkeley Heights, New Jersey.

References

Living people
21st-century American businesspeople
21st-century American businesswomen
American chief executives of financial services companies
American women chief executives
Collingswood High School alumni
Lehigh Mountain Hawks women's basketball players
Lehigh Mountain Hawks women's lacrosse players
People from Berkeley Heights, New Jersey
People from Collingswood, New Jersey
Women's National Basketball Association commissioners
1964 births